Sarah Clare Raven (born 1963) is an English gardener, cook and writer.

Background
Raven was born in Cambridge, the daughter of John Earle Raven (d. 1980), a classics don and Senior Tutor at King's College, Cambridge, and his wife Faith née Smith (Constance Faith Alethea Hugh Smith), a daughter of Owen Hugh Smith (1869–1958).

Raven graduated from the University of Edinburgh with a degree in history and then trained as a doctor at the University of London. 

She is married to writer Adam Nicolson, and has two daughters with him, plus three stepsons from his previous marriage. Her family's move to a small farm in Sussex was depicted in Nicolson's book Perch Hill: A New Life.

She now runs a mail-order company, specialising in cutting plants. The gardener Christopher Lloyd, a near-neighbour at Great Dixter, described Raven in the mid-1990s as "really energetic and creative ... promot[ing] a more dynamic and showy style of gardening than has been fashionable for many years".

Raven's publications include The Cutting Garden, The Bold and Brilliant Garden, The Great Vegetable Plot, Sarah Raven's Garden Cookbook (U.S. title: In Season) which was named Cookery Book of the Year by the Guild of Food Writers in 2008. and A Year Full of Flowers which describes her garden at Perch Hill in Sussex.
In 2011, she published a monumental book on Wild Flowers, with photographs by Jonathan Buckley, who has worked with her on most of her books. A BBC2 television series called Bees, Butterflies and Blooms, focusing on the national decline in pollinating insects and championing nectar-rich flowers as a way of saving them, was broadcast in February 2012. She presented an episode of Great British Garden Revival which aired on BBC Two in 2014. Sissinghurst: Vita Sackville-West and the Creation of a Garden was published in November 2014.

Publications
The Cutting Garden
The Bold and Brilliant Garden
The Great Vegetable Plot
Sarah Raven's Garden Cookbook (U.S. title: In Season)
A Year Full of Flowers
Wild Flowers (2011) – with photographs by Jonathan Buckley
Sissinghurst: Vita Sackville-West and the Creation of a Garden (2014)

References

External links
sarahraven.com
Perch Hill
 
BBC profile with photograph

Living people
People from Cambridge
English television presenters
English gardeners
English garden writers
Carnock
Alumni of the University of Edinburgh
Alumni of the University of London
1963 births
20th-century English women writers
20th-century English writers